The Carter Twin-Engine was an American automobile manufactured between 1907 and 1908.  Predecessor to the Washington, it featured two separate 35 hp internal combustion power units.

References
David Burgess Wise, The New Illustrated Encyclopedia of Automobiles.

Defunct motor vehicle manufacturers of the United States